The Tao Xingzhi Memorial is a memorial built in memory of the Chinese scholar Tao Xingzhi, located in Qixia District, Nanjing, Jiangsu province, China.

Overview 
The memorial is a tomb and museum dedicated to the life of Tao Xingzhi. 

The roof of the  building, shaped like a thatched cottage, is made from cement. Within the building is a bronze statue of Tao and two exhibition rooms, with 120 pictures, manuscripts, and more than 200 artifacts.

The memorial is managed by the Nanjing Xiaozhuang University, which was established by Tao in 1926 and was initially known as the Xiaozhuang School, or Rural Teacher School.

Gallery

References

External links

Museums in Nanjing
Biographical museums in China
Tourist attractions in Nanjing
Monuments and memorials in China